The American rock band Shinedown has released seven studio albums, two live albums, five extended plays, three video albums, and 31 singles.

All of Shinedown's singles have charted on at least one Billboard tracking chart. Their biggest hit is "Second Chance", the second single from their album The Sound of Madness. The single reached number seven on the Hot 100, number three on the Mainstream Top 40, and number one on the Hot Mainstream Rock Tracks, Alternative Songs, and Adult Top 40 charts.

Shinedown has found much of its success on the Hot Mainstream Rock Tracks chart, as each of their 30 singles in the format has reached the top five, with "Dead Don't Die" becoming the most recent in March 2023. Of those 30 singles, eighteen of them have climbed to the number one spot, a chart record.

The band also has three singles that spent at least 10 weeks at number one. Their first single to do this was also their first ever chart topper, "Save Me", which came from the 2005 album Us and Them. "Second Chance" became the second during its massive run of success. The third and most recent was "Bully", which was released in 2012 off of the album Amaryllis.

Albums

Studio albums

Notes

Live albums

Compilation albums

Extended plays

Singles

Notes

Promotional singles

Video albums

Music videos

Other songs

References

Discographies of American artists
 
 
Rock music group discographies